David Charles Daneshgar (born June 18, 1981 in Westlake Village, California) is an American  former professional poker player and the co-founder of BloomNation.com.

Poker 

Daneshgar became interested in poker while attending the University of California, Berkeley, where he taught a pass/not pass course on the Statistics and Probability of Gaming. In 2006, he was ranked the #5 player in the world by Card Player magazine. That year, he won major titles at Borgata Winter Poker Open, Bicycle Casino Winnin' o' the Green,  and Bellagio Five Diamond World Poker Classic. In 2008, he captured his first World Series of Poker bracelet and the $625,443 cash prize. , his total live tournament winnings exceed $2,400,000.

BloomNation 

In 2010, while attending the University of Chicago Booth School of Business, Daneshgar co-founded the online floral marketplace BloomNation with Farbod Shoraka and Gregg Weisstein. He won a two-day poker tournament in Los Angeles that gave the company enough seed funding to create a beta version of the marketplace and establish proof of concept. BloomNation has since raised $1.65 million in seed funding led by Andreessen Horowitz with participation from Spark Capital, Chicago Ventures and CrunchFund.

References 

1981 births
Living people
American poker players
People from Westlake Village, California